The Sovereign Yidindji Government or Yidindji Tribal Nation is an Aboriginal Australian microstate that is part of the Australian Aboriginal Sovereignty. Led by Murrumu Walubara Yidindji, members of the Yidindji nation renounced legal ties with Australia in 2014. The land they claim lies in the state of Queensland and stretches "south of Port Douglas, through Cairns, inland across the Atherton Tablelands and  out to sea”. The chief minister is Gudju Gudju Gimuybara, while Murrumu is foreign affairs and trade minister.

The Yidindji government is hoping to enter into a memorandum of understanding with the Commonwealth of Australia. It is also "reaching out to countries like Russia and Venezuela to establish diplomatic relations".

The Yidindji nation has its own driver licensing system. Murrumu was charged by police in May 2015 after being caught with a licence and registration plates issued by the Yidindji government and not by the Queensland government.

References

External links
 

Aboriginal micronations
Micronations in Australia
2014 establishments in Australia
Indigenous Australian politics